CHST may refer to:

 CHST-FM, a radio station (102.3 FM) licensed to London, Ontario, Canada
 Canada Health and Social Transfer
 Chamorro Time Zone (ChST), UTC+10